The women's 5000 meter at the 2010 KNSB Dutch Single Distance Championships took place in Heerenveen at the Thialf ice skating rink on Sunday 1 November 2009. Although this tournament was held in 2009, it was part of the 2009–2010 speed skating season.

There were 10 participants. There was a qualification selection incentive for the next following 2009–10 ISU Speed Skating World Cup tournaments.

Title holder was Renate Groenewold.

Overview

Result

Draw

Source:

References

Single Distance Championships
2010 Single Distance
World